Saud Ali Kariri (born 8 July 1980) is a Saudi Arabian former footballer who played as a midfielder, and who previously played with Al Ittihad. He also previously played for Al-Qadisiyah the team that introduced most of Saudi football stars.

He played for the Saudi Arabia national team and was called up to the squad to participate in the 2006 FIFA World Cup. After 14 years, in 2015 he retired from the national team, he has 133 caps.

Club career

Al-Hilal
On 24 December 2013, Saud transferred from Ittihad to Al-Hilal for 21 Million Saudi Riyals. On 22 June 2015, Saud scored his first goal for Al-Hilal against Al-Faisaly which ended 3-0. He got his first red card against Al-Nassr in the 94th minute. On 21 November 2015, he scored his second goal for Al-Hilal against Al-Khaleej the match ended in massive win for his team, the score was 7-0. He left in 2016.

Al-Shabab
On 22 September 2016, Saud went to Al-Shabab. His debut was against Al-Khaleej which ended 2-1.

International goals

Scores and results list Saudi Arabia's goal tally first.

Honours

Club
Al-Ittihad
 Saudi Professional League (2): 2006–07, 2008–09; Runners-up 2009–10, 2010–11
 King Cup of Champions (2): 2010, 2013; Runners-up 2008, 2009, 2011
 Saudi Super Cup: Runners-up 2013
 AFC Champions League (2): 2004, 2005; Runners-up 2009
 Crown Prince Cup (1): 2003–04
 Arab Club Champions Cup (1): 2004–05

Al-Hilal
 Saudi Professional League: Runners-up 2013–14, 2015–16
 King Cup (1): 2015
 Saudi Super Cup (1): 2015  :Runners-up 2016
 Crown Prince Cup (1): 2015–16; Runners-up 2013–14, 2014–15
 AFC Champions League: Runners-up 2014

International
 AFC Asian Cup: Runners-up 2007
 Gulf Cup of Nations (1): 2003; Runners-up 2009, 2014
Arab Nations Cup (1): 2002

See also
List of men's footballers with 100 or more international caps

References

External links

Kariri info at ksa.team

1980 births
Living people
Saudi Arabian footballers
Saudi Arabia international footballers
Association football midfielders
2006 FIFA World Cup players
2007 AFC Asian Cup players
2011 AFC Asian Cup players
Al-Qadsiah FC players
Ittihad FC players
Al Hilal SFC players
Al-Shabab FC (Riyadh) players
People from Jizan Province
2004 AFC Asian Cup players
2015 AFC Asian Cup players
FIFA Century Club
Saudi Professional League players